Ramaria stricta, commonly known as the strict-branch coral is a coral fungus of the genus Ramaria. It has a cosmopolitan distribution, and grows on dead wood, stumps, trunks, and branches of both deciduous and coniferous trees. Its color is typically light tan to vinaceous-brown. All parts of the mushroom will bruise when handled. There are several lookalike corals that can usually be distinguished from R. stricta by differences in coloration, bruising reaction, or microscopic features. The fungus is inedible due to its unpleasant odor and bitter taste.

Taxonomy
The species was originally described under the name Clavaria stricta by Christian Hendrik Persoon in 1795. In 1888, French mycologist Lucien Quélet transferred the species to the genus Ramaria.

It is commonly known as the "upright coral".

Description
The color of the fruit body is brownish to yellow, becoming paler toward extremities. It bruises light reddish brown. The basidiocarp has a leathery texture when fresh, but becomes brittle when dry. Growing from a whitish base, the stipe is branched up to 8 times, and the branches are all upright and nearly parallel. The branches ending in 4 to 5 thornlike tips. The stipe is single or branching from the base, with white mycelium and rhizomorphs radiating from the base. The odor is of anise and the taste is bitter.

The fruit bodies have been described as "edible but unpalatable," although later field guides say the species is inedible.

The spore print is dark yellow. Spores are roughly elliptical, dotted with low cyanophilous warts, and measure 7–10 by 3.5–5.5 μm. The basidia have basal clamps are mostly four-spored, and sometimes have cyanophilous granular contents.

Variants
Several variants have been described:

 var. alba
 var. concolor
 var. fumida
 var. violaceo-tincta

Similar species
Another widespread and common coral, R. apiculata, typically grows on conifer wood, and bruises brown like R. stricta, but it has green pigmentation. R. apiculata is a dull buff-tan to dull orange-brown, and young fruit bodies  often have white branch tips. R. gracilis prefers conifer wood, and has lighter colors than R. stricta. The tropical R. moelleriana can only be reliably distinguished from R. sticta by location and microscopic characteristics. R. flava is mycorrhizal, and grows under coniferous and deciduous trees. Its fruit bodies are typically taller, have a more  unpleasant odor, and a less bitter taste. R. rubella (also known as R. acris) is pinkish tan, and R. tsugina stains green.

Distribution and habitat
Ramaria stricta has a cosmopolitan distribution, and is a fairly common species. The fungus is lignicolous, common in late summer and fall in coniferous forests of the Pacific Coast and Rocky Mountains. The fungus grows on dead wood, stumps, trunks, and branches of both leafy and coniferous trees. The form that grows on deciduous wood tends to be more orange and less bushy than those which grow on coniferous wood. Fruit bodies can form in "log lines" where decaying wood is buried underground near the surface, or is in an advanced state of decomposition.

References

Gomphaceae
Fungi of Europe
Fungi of North America
Inedible fungi
Fungi described in 1795
Taxa named by Christiaan Hendrik Persoon